The following is a list of paintings by Judith Leyster that are generally accepted as autographed by the Frima Fox Hofrichter catalog and other sources.

Sources

Judith Leyster: A Woman Painter in Holland's Golden Age, by Frima Fox Hofrichter, Doornspijk, 1989, Davaco Publishers, 
Judith Leyster paintings in the RKD

References

 
Leyster